Behi Dehbokri Rural District is in Simmineh District of Bukan County, West Azerbaijan province, Iran. At the National Census of 2006, its population was 4,357 in 845 households. There were 3,747 inhabitants in 899 households at the following census of 2011. At the most recent census of 2016, the population of the rural district was 3,333 in 1,038 households. The largest of its 25 villages was Javanmard, with 646 people.

References 

Bukan County

Rural Districts of West Azerbaijan Province

Populated places in West Azerbaijan Province

Populated places in Bukan County